The St. Louis Gaelic Athletic Club (STLGAC) is an amateur Irish and international cultural and sporting club primarily focused on promoting Gaelic games in the St. Louis, Missouri metro area. The club was founded as the St. Louis Hurling Club, but changed its name to better reflect the club's participation in its two main sports; hurling and Gaelic football.

History
The club was founded in the Summer of 2002 on the south side of Tower Grove Park, by three former Milwaukee Hurling Club mates, Paul C. Rohde, Dan Lapke, and Patrick O’Connor. The vision included introducing the sport of hurling to the metro St. Louis, Missouri area, creating opportunities to play the sport, developing better hurlers, and developing strong St. Louis representation in nationwide competition. Through targeted recruiting and promoting the sport, potential Hurlers continued to join, and in Autumn 2002, small scrimmages were being held at the southwest corner, and eventually the northeast section of Tower Grove, to allow for the continued growth.

In March 2003, the downtown and AOH-Dogtown St. Patrick's Day parades saw hurling represented for the first time in the history of St. Louis. On April 26, 2003, St. Louis played its first national match at Chicago's Gaelic Park, defeating the University of Notre Dame 3-9 (19) to 2-3 (9). A follow-up loss to Atlanta in the tournament placed St. Louis a respectable 2nd place in its first outing as a Club. Two subsequent matches against Milwaukee rounded out national competition for St. Louis in 2003.

In May 2003, the St. Louis Hurling Club was honored, one year ahead of their objective date, with the rare invitation to join 21 other American cities aligned with the North American County Board (NACB). NACB is overseen by the Gaelic Athletic Association (GAA), the governing body of hurling at its top level in Ireland. The St. Louis Hurling Club is the first association of American-born hurlers ever invited to join NACB in a club's first year of organization, and is the second-largest club of primarily American-born hurlers in North America. A seven-members executive committee was formed on May 22, 2003, for two year terms, with the founding president's term serving as four consecutive years.

Television, radio, newspaper and magazine exposure increased the number of interested hurlers, and in September 2003, the first ever St. Louis Hurling Club season was held, an 8-week league featuring three teams: Brown & Brown Financial, Black Thorn Sons of Liberty, and McGurk's Black Shamrocks, with McGurk's defeating Brown & Brown, winning the first ever Gateway Cup on November 22, 2003. September also brought a Proclamation from the Irish Consulate office, commending the club on its league and advancing the sport of Hurling.

In April 2004, the club's success allowed for the addition of a fourth team, Llywelyn's Red Dragons, and began its Spring league, welcomed by the Missouri House of Representatives through a state resolution commending the club for its success. Black Thorn Sons of Liberty defeated McGurk's for the Spring league Cup on June 19, 2004. In September, the St. Louis Hurling Club traveled to Boulder, Colorado, representing St. Louis in a NACB finals tournament for the first time ever. The result included victories over Milwaukee and a thrilling come-from-behind victory over Seattle. The National Championship for the new Jr.-C Division belonged to St. Louis.

The St. Louis Hurling Club began its Autumn 2004 season on September 18 with a Proclamation from the City of St. Louis, congratulating the club on its National Championship and commemorating the first anniversary of the inaugural league, where Hurling was played among St. Louisans for the first time. Mayor Francis Slay proclaimed September 25, 2004 “St. Louis Hurling Club Appreciation Day”.

St. Louis won the Junior D Gaelic Football Championship in 2013 at the NACB Finals in Cleveland, OH. They defeated Indianapolis(2-10 0–7), Baltimore(5-13 0–7), Houston(6-9 0–7) on the way to the Championship. In the Championship they defeated a tough Buffalo side by a score of 2–4 to 0-8 and won by a late goal by club legend John Behl.

Currently, the club operates an eight-team hurling league (which, while co-ed, is also supplemented by a growing camogie competition) in the spring and summer and a six-team football league in the late summer and fall, hosting games at various sites throughout the St Louis metropolitan area. In addition to their representative side, they regularly join forces with other clubs in the Midwest to send teams overseas: most recently, in 2013 the "Heartland Hurlers", composed of top players from St Louis, Indianapolis and Kansas City, traveled to Ireland for a week of training and competition with sides from Kilkenny, Limerick and Tipperary, finishing with a tournament in Thurles where "the Interstate 70 Boys" reached the semi-finals and received recognition from Irish TV when the group was shown during a match at Semple Stadium.

Objectives
The club's objectives were set out January 10, 2003: (a) recruit at least 30 active members (exceeded), enabling a minimum two-team league, (exceeded with a three-team league) (b) increase awareness of the sport and the club in the metropolitan area through aggressive marketing, (achieved) (c) establish a strong national reputation of St. Louis hurling through victories in nationwide competition, (achieved) (d) improve quality of play to a level adequate for consideration into the North American County Board in 2004 (achieved one year ahead of schedule).

Alongside their Spring and Autumn leagues, the Club stays committed to representing the city in national competitions, festivals, and exhibition matches to promote the popularity of Hurling, Gaelic Football, and Camogie in St. Louis and across the country.

See also
List of Gaelic Athletic Association clubs

External links
 Official Website of the North American Gaelic Athletic Association
 Milwaukee Hurling Club
 Atlanta Hurling Club
 St. Louis Hurling Club
 Akron Hurling Club

Gaelic football clubs in the United States
Hurling clubs in the United States
Hurling in Missouri
Irish-American culture in Missouri